Lonny Leroy Baxter (born January 27, 1979) is an American former professional basketball player.

College career

While attending the University of Maryland, College Park, Baxter won the 2002 NCAA championship along with teammates and future NBA players Juan Dixon, Steve Blake and Chris Wilcox by defeating Indiana.  He was named a regional MVP of the NCAA Tournament twice, in 2001 and 2002.

Professional career

NBA 
Baxter was selected by the Chicago Bulls with the 15th pick of the second round (44th overall) of the 2002 NBA Draft. On February 9, 2006, Baxter was traded by the Houston Rockets to the Charlotte Bobcats for Keith Bogans.

Baxter's final game was played on April 19th, 2006 in a 96 - 86 win over the Philadelphia 76ers where he played for 7 minutes and the only stat, he recorded was 1 rebound. 

Baxter has career NBA averages of 3.9 points and 2.9 rebounds in 162 total games from 2002 to 2006.

Europe

During the 2004–05 season Baxter played some games for the Greek A1 League team Panathinaikos, before getting injured and agreeing with the club for his release. On August 8, 2006, Baxter signed with the Italian League team Montepaschi Siena. In 2008, he joined Panionios. In 2009, he moved to Beşiktaş Cola Turka.

Personal
As of January 14, 2019, Baxter has the job of Sales Consultant for Antwerpen Toyota in Clarksville, Maryland.
 
On August 16, 2006, Baxter was arrested in Washington, D.C., only a few blocks from the White House after firing a .40 caliber Glock handgun into the air.  On August 23, 2006, Baxter was sentenced to 60 days in prison after pleading guilty to possession of an unregistered firearm and unregistered ammunition charges.  The judge in the case did not accept the plea bargain that had been arranged with the prosecution for a sentence of time served.

"There's no good reason for a person who's not working in law enforcement or presidential protection to be in possession of a loaded weapon within blocks of the White House, let alone to fire it into the air," Iscoe said.

Baxter was later charged with shipping four guns via FedEx in July 2006 without notifying them that the shipment contained firearms.  Baxter pled guilty to this crime on July 19, 2007.
 He was sentenced to 60 days in jail, two years of supervised release and a $2,000 fine on August 31, 2007.

References

External links

Euroleague.net Profile
Panionios Profile
Eurobasket.com Profile
ULEBCup.com Profile

1979 births
Living people
American expatriate basketball people in Canada
American expatriate basketball people in Greece
American expatriate basketball people in Italy
American expatriate basketball people in Russia
American expatriate basketball people in Spain
American expatriate basketball people in Turkey
American expatriate basketball people in Venezuela
American men's basketball players
American sportspeople convicted of crimes
Basketball players from Maryland
Basketball players from Washington, D.C.
BC Enisey players
Beşiktaş men's basketball players
Centers (basketball)
Charlotte Bobcats expansion draft picks
Charlotte Bobcats players
Chicago Bulls draft picks
Chicago Bulls players
Guaiqueríes de Margarita players
Hargrave Military Academy alumni
Houston Rockets players
Joventut Badalona players
Liga ACB players
Maryland Terrapins men's basketball players
Medalists at the 2001 Summer Universiade
Mens Sana Basket players
New Orleans Hornets players
Panathinaikos B.C. players
Panionios B.C. players
People from Silver Spring, Maryland
Power forwards (basketball)
Toronto Raptors players
Universiade bronze medalists for the United States
Universiade medalists in basketball
Washington Wizards players
Yakima Sun Kings players